= Kommunarka (confectionery plant) =

Confectionery plant in Belarus

JSC Kommunarka
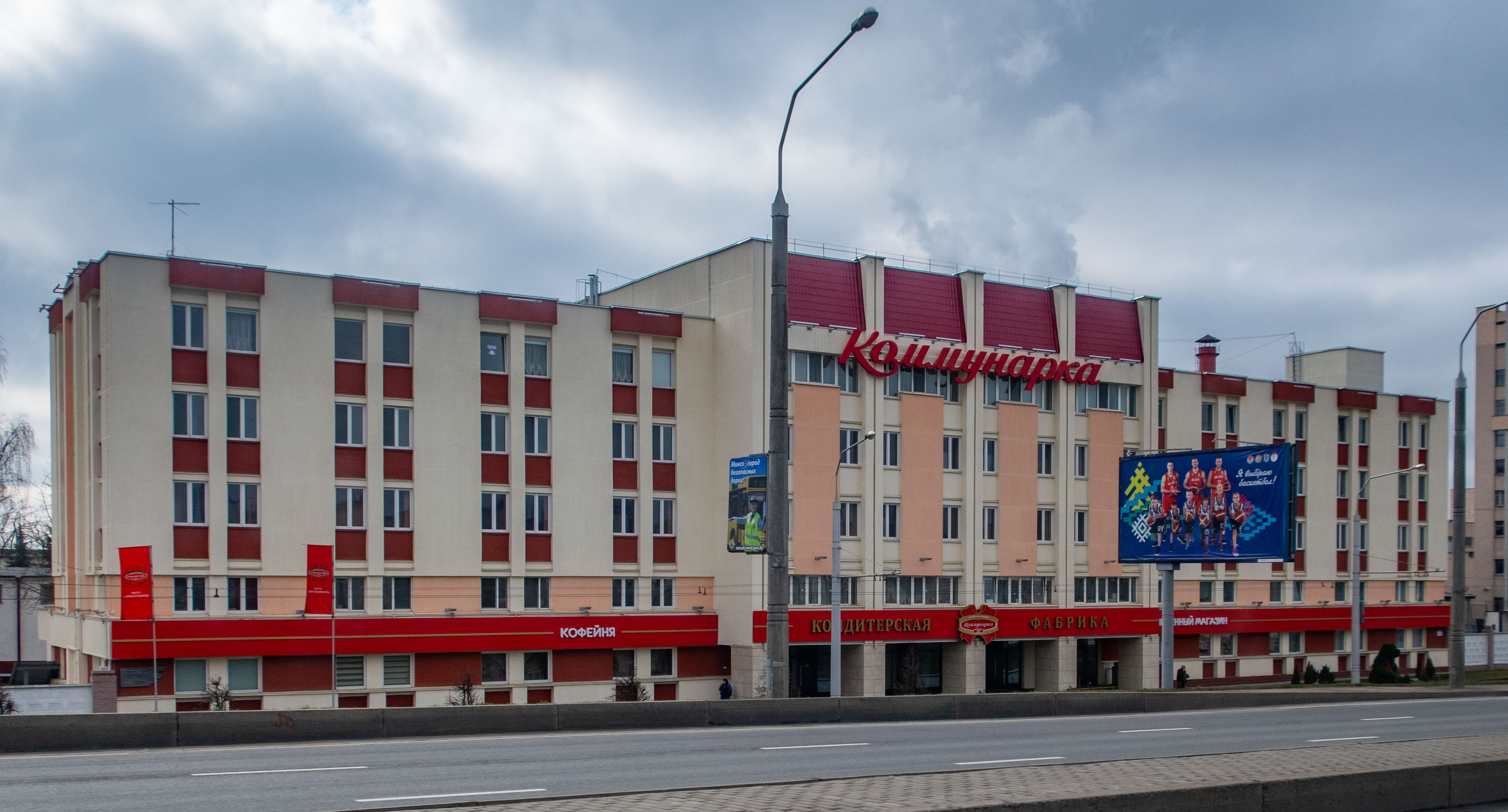
- Type: Joint-stock company
- Industry: Confectionery
- Founded: 1905
- Headquarters: Minsk, Belarus

JSC Kommunarka (Belarusian: ААТ «Камунарка», Russian: СОАО «Коммунарка») is one of the largest confectionery manufacturers in Minsk, Belarus.

== History ==
=== Early history ===
The origins of Kommunarka date to February 15, 1905, when a trade certificate was issued in Minsk for a business known as “The coffee shop with confectionery products, the bakery of confectionery products of Georgy Vikentievich Rachkovsky.” The enterprise was initially known as “Rachkovsky’s Coffee House and Bakery.”

By 1910, it had developed into a pastry shop, and by 1914 it operated as “George’s Confectionery Factory.” Following the civil war, a labor collective of confectioners was established on the basis of the former enterprise by the Minsk Labor Exchange to provide employment for unemployed workers. The factory was renamed “The First Belarusian Confectionery Factory.”

In 1926 the enterprise was renamed “Progress,” and in 1929 it adopted the name Kommunarka. In connection with the 12th anniversary of the October Revolution, it became known as the Minsk Confectionery Factory Kommunarka.

=== Soviet and post-Soviet period ===
From the late 1950s, the factory placed increasing emphasis on developing new confectionery recipes. During the 1950s and 1960s, Kommunarka introduced a number of confectionery products that later became well known across the Soviet Union, including Chocolate Bottles (1957), Grilliaz (1959), Soufflé candies (1960), Capital candies (1961), Loved Alyonka (1965), and Little Red Riding Hood (1967).

In 1994, following the dissolution of the Soviet Union, the factory was reorganized as an open joint-stock company. In 2008, it was formally renamed OJSC Kommunarka.

=== Nationalization dispute ===
In 2012, a dispute arose between private investors and the Belarusian government concerning the ownership of Kommunarka. President Alexander Lukashenko accused investors of having conducted an illegal privatization of the factory in 1994. Investors and opposition media outlets, in turn, accused the government of unlawfully nationalizing a profitable enterprise.

The largest private investor, Marat Novikov, publicly described the government’s actions as illegal and damaging to Belarus’s investment climate. On August 1, 2012, the Supreme Economic Court of Belarus received claims from the State Property Committee against Kommunarka.

On October 12, 2012, during a meeting on the development of the confectionery industry, Lukashenko called for an investigation into the factory’s privatization and operations since the Soviet period and ordered the dissolution of supervisory boards of shareholders. On October 26, a new company charter was approved, increasing the state’s ownership stake to 57%.

== Operations ==
In recent years, Kommunarka has produced up to 20,000 tons of confectionery products annually, covering approximately 187 product names, including chocolate, sweets, caramel, and dragees. In 2006, production reached 20,223 tons. According to Belgospischeprom, annual output later increased to approximately 25,000 tons and expanded to around 300 product varieties, including candy drops, caramels, chocolates, toffees, waffles, and other confectionery products.

Production is largely automated. The factory primarily uses locally sourced raw materials and emphasizes the use of natural ingredients and flavorings.
